This article lists the Vietnam teams in the World Championship. It details the participation and performances in the competition since its rebranding and reformatting in 2012.

Participations
 PS : Play-in stage, PL : Play-in Play-off, GS : Group Stage, QF : Quarterfinals, SF : Semifinals, RU : Runners-Up, W : Winners

Vietnamese teams statistics

Dashing Buffalo/Saigon Buffalo
Rosters

GAM Esports
Rosters

Saigon Joker
Rosters

Lowkey Esports
Rosters

Record

Most kills

References 

2013 establishments in Vietnam
Sports leagues in Asia
League of Legends competitions